Mt. Begbie Brewing Company is a brewery in Revelstoke, British Columbia, Canada. Opened in 1996, the company is named after Mt. Begbie, a mountain in Revelstoke, which in turn was named after Matthew Baillie Begbie. As of October 2013, the brewery employs 10 full-time employees at its location in Revelstoke.

Awards

2013

Canadian Brewing Awards
 Cream Ale - Gold - Begbie Cream Ale

2012

Canadian Brewing Awards
 Cream Ale - Bronze - Begbie Cream Ale

BC Beer Awards
 Session - Gold - High Country Kolsch
 Session - Bronze - Begbie Cream Ale

2011
Canadian Brewing Awards
 Kolsch - Gold - High Country Kolsch

2010
Canadian Brewing Awards
 English Style India Pale Ale - Gold - Nasty Habit IPA

2007
Canadian Brewing Awards
 Brown Ale - Bronze - Tall Timber Ale

See also

 Beer in Canada

References

Beer brewing companies based in British Columbia
1996 establishments in British Columbia